Rafael Márquez Méndez (born 25 March 1975) is a Mexican former professional boxer who competed from 1995 to 2013. He is a two-time world champion in two weight classes, having held the IBF bantamweight title from 2003 to 2007; and the WBC, Ring magazine, and lineal super bantamweight titles in 2007. He also held the IBO bantamweight title from 2005 to 2007, and challenged once for WBO featherweight title in 2011. Marquez will be inducted into the International Boxing Hall of Fame as part of the class of 2023.

Márquez was known for his formidable knockout power and relentless pressure fighting style. His older brother Juan Manuel Márquez is also a professional boxer and multiple-time world champion.

Professional career
Márquez began his professional boxing career with an eighth-round knockout loss to former WBC Bantamweight champion Victor Rabanales.

He gained recognition by defeating two division world champion and future hall of fame member Mark Johnson (40-1-0) by a split decision. In a rematch, Márquez knocked out Johnson in the eighth round in an IBF bantamweight title eliminator bout.

Bantamweight
On February 15, 2003, he came from behind to knock out Tim Austin (25-0-1) to claim the IBF Bantamweight title, in what was considered to be a big upset. Austin had been undefeated in 10 title fights until that loss. Márquez went on to successfully defend his title seven times. His notable title defenses were two victories over former light flyweight champion Mauricio Pastrana, a decision win over Ricardo Vargas and two knockout victories over former as well as future IBO Bantamweight champion Silence Mabuza, whom he defeated for the second time on August 5, 2006 in his final defense.

Super Bantamweight

Márquez moved up a weight division to challenge and defeat WBC and lineal super bantamweight champion Israel Vázquez in seven rounds. However, in a rematch in July 2007, Márquez lost his title after being defeated by Vázquez in the sixth round when the referee stopped the fight. The rematch was named the 2007 fight of the year. In the rubber match of their trilogy, Rafael lost a split decision, with scores of 113-112 and 114-111 to Vázquez, with one judge seeing it 114-111 for Márquez. Márquez may not have lost this bout if not for a point deduction for a low blow in the tenth round. Marquez and promoter Gary Shaw claimed that the punch was on the belt line and should not have elicited any deductions. Márquez was able to knock Vázquez down for the first time in the trilogy in this third fight, but Vázquez in turn put Márquez down in the final seconds of the 12th round, securing the victory and giving Márquez his fifth defeat.
 
Márquez was ranked number three in The Ring magazine's pound-for-pound rankings. and ranked as the Ring Magazine's number one Bantamweight boxer. He later became the top ranked boxer in the Super Bantamweight division before his loss to Vázquez.

Featherweight
Márquez was inactive for over a year as he recuperated from the trilogy with Vázquez. On May 23, 2009, he returned to the ring by scoring a 3rd-round TKO over José Francisco Mendoza (21-2-2) in the featherweight division.

In the first week of May 2010, Márquez announced his 4th and final match with Israel Vásquez. After three epic battles, Vázquez and Márquez fought for a fourth time on May 22, 2010 at the Staples Center in Los Angeles, California. The bout was appropriately titled "Once and Four All" and carried live by Showtime. Márquez scored a third-round TKO victory over Vázquez to even their series at two wins each.
Afterwards, Márquez stated; "The fifth one could be a possibility if the fans vote for it. That is what I live for. Israel Vásquez is a great fighter."

In his next fight, he was scheduled to challenge undefeated WBO Featherweight champion Juan Manuel Lopez on September 18, 2010, however, the fight had to be postponed by several weeks when Márquez suffered a thumb injury which prevented him from training. Márquez would ultimately lose the bout by 8th-round TKO after he was unable to continue due to a shoulder injury. After the fight, Márquez said that he had chosen to proceed with the bout despite a right shoulder injury suffered before the contest because he did not wish to cause a second delay. According to Márquez, he re-aggravated that injury in the third round during a flurry of punches. He also expressed his eagerness to face Lopez in a rematch. It was later revealed that Márquez had suffered a hairline fracture  in his right shoulder blade during the fight and would require 6 months to recover from the injury.

Return to Super Bantamweight
On 16 July 2011, Márquez made his comeback in Cancún on the same card as his brother, Juan Manuel, against Eduardo Becerril. Both fights were tune-ups and the younger Márquez brother comfortably dealt with his opponent, knocking him down once on the way to a 6th-round TKO.

Márquez fought against WBC Super Bantamweight champion Toshiaki Nishioka on 1 October at the MGM Grand Garden Arena in Las Vegas. Marquez lost by unanimous decision.

Professional boxing record

Outside the ring
He was involved in a car accident in Cuernavaca, Mexico.  He was on his way to the airport in Mexico City to go to New York to receive the award for fight of the year, where he fought Israel Vázquez.

He made his appearance on Fight Night Round 2 launched in 2005.

He is Juan Manuel Marquez's brother; he also has a sister named Carmela. Their dad is a former professional boxer.

See also
List of super bantamweight boxing champions
List of featherweight boxing champions
List of WBC world champions
List of Mexican boxing world champions
List of notable boxing families
Márquez–Vázquez rivalry

References

External links

1975 births
Bantamweight boxers
International Boxing Federation champions
Living people
Boxers from Mexico City
World Boxing Council champions
Mexican male boxers
Super-bantamweight boxers
Featherweight boxers
The Ring (magazine) champions
International Boxing Organization champions